Convoy ON 113 was a trade convoy of merchant ships during the second World War. It was the 113th of the numbered series of ON convoys Outbound from the British Isles to North America. The ships departed Liverpool on 17 July 1942 and were joined on 18 July by Mid-Ocean Escort Force Group C-2. They were found on 24 July by the eleven U-boats of Wolf pack Wolf. Five ships were sunk before the convoy reached Halifax, Nova Scotia on 31 July.

Ships in the convoy
These ships were members of Convoy ON 113.

References

Bibliography

External links
ON.113 at convoyweb

ON113
Naval battles of World War II involving Canada
C